Sebba is a surname. Notable people with the surname include: 

Abdul Hamid Sebba (1934–2021), Brazilian lawyer and politician
Anne Sebba (born 1951), British biographer, writer, lecturer and journalist
César Augusto Sebba, Brazilian basketball player
Mark Sebba (1948–2018), British fashion entrepreneur, husband of Anne